Metretopodidae is a family of cleftfooted minnow mayflies in the order Ephemeroptera. There are at least 3 genera and more than 20 described species in Metretopodidae.

Genera
These three genera belong to the family Metretopodidae:
 Metreplecton Kluge, 1996
 Metretopus Eaton, 1901
 Siphloplecton Clemens, 1915

References

Further reading

 
 
 
 

Mayflies
Articles created by Qbugbot